Connie Chan Po-chu (born 1 January 1947) is a Chinese actor who has made more than 230 films in a variety of genres, from traditional Cantonese opera and wuxia movies to contemporary youth musicals; action films to comedies; melodramas and romances. Owing to her popularity, she was dubbed "The Movie-Fan Princess". During the 1960s, Connie Chan was one of Hong Kong cinema's most beloved teen idols.

Chan is one of at least nine siblings who were born to impoverished parents in Guangdong, China. To increase their children's chances of survival, Chan's birth parents gave away some of their youngest to other families. Chan was adopted by renowned Cantonese opera stars Chan Fei-nung and Kung Fan-hung. Her godfather is actor Cho Tat Wah. She has a son named Dexter Yeung, who stars in the 2008 TVB series Wasabi Mon Amour and Moonlight Resonance.

Early life and career
At the age of five-and-a-half, she started learning Cantonese opera from her adoptive parents, later becoming an apprentice of Peking opera master Fen Juhua, who was one of the first wuxia actresses in Shanghai during the 1920s. When Connie was nine, she began performing onstage. One year later, she and Leung Bo-chu – daughter of the great comic actor and opera clown Leung Sing-po – were the leading stars of the Double Chu Opera Troupe. In 1958, Connie made her film debut in the Cantonese opera Madam Chun Heung-lin. The following year, she played in two Mandarin-language productions for the MP&GI studio: as a widow's daughter in Yue Feng's melodrama For Better, For Worse, and as a young boy in Tao Qin's comedy The Scout Master. That same year, she also played the role of a filial son in Breaking the Coffin to Rescue Mother.

During her teenage years, Connie appeared more and more frequently on the silver screen – at first, mostly in Cantonese operas, often with the legendary Master Yam Kim-fai, who had taken Connie as her beloved student; but later, almost exclusively in wuxia movies, usually in the company of veteran action stars Yu So Chow, Cho Tat Wah, and perennial bad guy Shih Kien. She also joined the Sin-Hok Kong-luen Film Company's stable of young stars – which included Suet Nei, Nancy Sit Ka-yin, and Kenneth Tsang Kong – and took part in director Chan Lit-ban's ground-breaking adaptations of Jin Yong's serialised novels The Golden Hairpin (1963–64) and The Snowflake Sword (1964). Released in three and four parts, these films were blockbuster extravaganzas, popular for their intricate plots, special effects, and complex action choreography. Two films in 1965 would give a boost to Chan's career: The Six-Fingered Lord of the Lute, in which she played the lead male role and was publicised with the creation of her very own fan-club; and The Black Rose, in which director Chor Yuen had the foresight to change her image by putting her in a contemporary role as a modern-day Robin Hood.

In 1966, her most frequent on-screen partner was Josephine Siao, who had also studied opera under Fen Juhua. The two were often cast as disciples of the same master and sometimes – when Connie played the male lead – as young heroes in love. Capitalizing on their chemistry, veteran director Lee Tit gave them the lead roles in Eternal Love, his remake of a popular opera from the 1950s. Even more successful was Chan Wan's Colourful Youth, which became the box office champ of the year and set the trend for Western-style musicals in Cantonese cinema. From then on, Connie and Josephine appeared increasingly in films with contemporary settings, but less frequently in each other's company; both were paired off with a variety of leading men in a profusion of comedies, musicals, romances, and action movies. Movie-Fan Princess was a prototype combo of all four genres, and more significantly, was the beginning of Connie's four-year on-screen romance with her most popular leading man, Lui Kei. Then, there was Lady Bond, Cantonese cinema's answer to 007, which spawned three sequels and fueled the transition from traditional wuxia pictures to contemporary action movies.

Connie's frenetic film output of the previous two years started to slow; her contemporary action films had played themselves out, and she settled down on-screen with leading man Lui Kei, who now became her most frequent costar in a medley of comedies, musicals, and romances – most of them directed by Wong Yiu and Chan Wan, who were responsible for the Chi-luen Film Company's signature youth musicals. With the help of her mother, Connie founded her own film company in 1968. Hung Bo's inaugural feature Teenage Love (1968) paired her with Lui Kei. Connie's mother produced the film, and she and Connie's father had small roles. Love With a Malaysian Girl (1969) and Her Tender Love (1969), both written and directed by Lui Kei, were the only other films produced through Hung Bo. Within a year, Connie stopped making films altogether and moved to San Francisco to finish her education. When she returned to Hong Kong in 1972, she made one last film with director Chor Yuen, who had recently signed on with Shaw Brothers. The Lizard, a Mandarin-language production, was Connie's final farewell to the silver screen.

After an absence of more than 25 years, Connie Chan emerged from retirement in 1999 to star in a stage production based on the life of her Master, Yam Kim-fai. Sentimental Journey won great acclaim and broke records with its 100-performance run; it was brought back for a six-week revival in 2005. After Sentimental Journey, Connie starred alongside Tony Leung Ka-Fai and Carina Lau in the stage play Red Boat, which ran for 64 performances. The play is an homage to the Cantonese Opera troupes that traditionally travelled by boat through the Pearl River delta region of China. In 2003, she staged a series of spectacular concerts, delighting fans with her cherished film songs and some Cantonese opera classics; her guest stars included Fung Bo-bo, Nancy Sit Ka-yin, and Maggie Cheung Ho-yee, who played the character based on Connie in the TVB television series Old Time Buddy and the film Those Were the Days.

On 4 February 2006, she performed with the Hong Kong Chinese Orchestra. Later that year, she starred with Adam Cheng in the stage play Only You, which ran for 70 performances. In January 2007, Connie was honoured with a lifetime achievement award at the Hong Kong Drama Awards.

Filmography

Selected filmography

Awards 
 She has a star on the Avenue of Stars on the Tsim Sha Tsui waterfront in Kowloon, Hong Kong.

Additional sources 
 Chan Po-chu – The Princess of Movie Fans. Hong Kong: Urban Council of Hong Kong, 1999.
 The Making of Martial Arts Films – As Told By Filmmakers and Stars. Hong Kong: Urban Council of Hong Kong, 1999. 
 The Restless Breed: Cantonese Stars of the Sixties. Hong Kong: Urban Council of Hong Kong, 1996. 
 A Study of the Hong Kong Swordplay Film (1945–1980); Hong Kong: Urban Council of Hong Kong, 1981.
 Fonoroff, Paul. Silver Light: A Pictorial History of Hong Kong Cinema 1920–1970. Hong Kong: Joint Publishing, 1997. 
 Kar, Law and Frank Bren. Hong Kong Cinema: A Cross-Cultural View. Lanham, Maryland: Scarecrow Press, 2004. 
 Teo, Stephen. Hong Kong Cinema: The Extra Dimensions. London: British Film Institute, 1997.

References

External links 

 Connie Chan Po-Chu at hkmdb.com
 Connie Chan Po-chu filmography at HKCinemagic.com
 She Spider LP at lpcover.com
 
 Website dedicated to Connie Chan
 Connie Chan Po-Chu at senscritique.com

1947 births
Actresses from Guangzhou
Hong Kong Cantonese opera actresses
Male impersonators in Cantonese opera
Hong Kong film actresses
Hong Kong television actresses
20th-century Hong Kong actresses
20th-century Hong Kong women singers
Living people
Musicians from Guangzhou
Members of the Election Committee of Hong Kong, 2007–2012
Members of the Election Committee of Hong Kong, 2012–2017
Chinese adoptees
Hong Kong idols